Chrisann Gordon (born 18 September 1994) is a Jamaican sprinter. She competed in the 4 × 400 metres relay at the 2015 World Championships in Beijing. She also competed at the Rio 2016 Summer Olympics in the 4 × 400 metres relay when Jamaica won silver.

Competition record

1Did not finish in the final

Personal bests
Outdoor
100 metres – 11.87 (+0.8 m/s, Kingston 2011)
200 metres – 23.28 (+2.0 m/s, El Paso 2015)
400 metres – 50.13 (Kingston, Jamaica 2017)
800 metres - 1:59.52 (Nashville, Tennessee 2022)
Indoor
200 metres – 23.90 (Albuquerque 2015)
400 metres – 51.69 (Birmingham 2016)

References

External links
 

1994 births
Living people
Jamaican female sprinters
World Athletics Championships athletes for Jamaica
Place of birth missing (living people)
World Athletics Championships medalists
Athletes (track and field) at the 2015 Pan American Games
Athletes (track and field) at the 2016 Summer Olympics
Olympic silver medalists for Jamaica
Olympic athletes of Jamaica
Olympic silver medalists in athletics (track and field)
Medalists at the 2016 Summer Olympics
Pan American Games medalists in athletics (track and field)
Pan American Games silver medalists for Jamaica
World Athletics Championships winners
Medalists at the 2015 Pan American Games
Olympic female sprinters
20th-century Jamaican women
21st-century Jamaican women